"One in a Million" is a song by German artist Sandy Mölling on her 2004 debut album, Unexpected. It was covered by Miley Cyrus for the soundtrack to season two of the television series Hannah Montana, and released on the accompanying soundtrack album Hannah Montana 2 (2007). Montana's cover was certified gold by the Recording Industry Association of America (RIAA) in March 10, 2023.

Mölling's version of the song includes the line "I feel drunk but I am sober. And I'm smiling all over. Every time I see the sparkle in your eyes."  For Hannah Montana's version, the line was changed to "Can't believe that I'm so lucky. I have never felt so happy. Every time I see the sparkle in your eyes."

In the Hannah Montana episode "You Are So Sue-able to Me", "One in a Million" is featured in the background with Jackson. It was used as the end of the episode "Achy Jakey Heart (Part 1)". In the episode "Song Sung Bad", Lilly asks Miley to sing the song for her mom's birthday present because it is her favorite Hannah song. Miley decides to have Lilly sing it herself because her mother would appreciate that more.

The song has also been covered by Japanese pop-rock singer Anna Tsuchiya, who changed the lyrics to keep only the music from the original song. The song in question is called "BLUE MOON" and is present on the track list of her 2006 single "Slap that Naughty Body/My Fate".

Charts

Certification

2004 songs
Hannah Montana songs
Hollywood Records singles
Songs written by Toby Gad
Songs written by Negin Djafari